Pilot licensing or certification refers to permits for operating aircraft. Flight crew licences are regulated by ICAO Annex 1 and issued by the civil aviation authority of each country. CAA’s have to establish that the holder has met a specific set of knowledge and experience before issuing the licence. The licence, with added ratings, allows a pilot to fly aircraft registered in the licence issuing state.

The ICAO Annex 1 - Personnel Licensing acts as the international minimum standards for licensing, however states can deviate from these standards by notifying ICAO about the changes. This, for instance, is why there are certain differences regarding licensing between EASA in Europe and the FAA in the United States.

Regulation by country
In the United States, pilot certification is regulated by the Federal Aviation Administration (FAA), a branch of the U.S. Department of Transportation (DOT). A pilot is certified under the authority of Parts 61 and 141 of Title 14 of the Code of Federal Regulations, also known as the Federal Aviation Regulations (FARs).

In Canada, licensing is issued by Transport Canada.

In most European countries, licences are issued by the national civil aviation authority according to a set of common rules established by the European Union Aviation Safety Agency (EASA) – Flight Crew Licensing (EASA-FCL). EASA member states include all European Union member states, as well as the members of the European Free Trade Association, i.e. Liechtenstein, Norway, Switzerland, and Iceland, which have been granted participation under Article 129 of the Basic Regulation (Regulation 2018/1139) and are members of the management board without voting rights.

In the United Kingdom, aviation is regulated by the Civil Aviation Authority. The United Kingdom left the EASA system on 31 December 2020.

History

Pilot licensing began soon after the invention of powered aircraft in 1903.

The Aéro-Club de France was founded in 1898 'to encourage aerial locomotion'. The Royal Aero Club followed in 1901 and the Aero Club of America was established in 1905. All three organizations, as well as representatives from Belgium, Germany, Italy, Spain and Switzerland founded the Federation Aeronautique Internationale (FAI) in 1905 as an international governing body for aeronautics. However, certificates or ratings from them were not initially mandatory.

The Aéro-Club de France began issuing certificates in 1910, although these were awarded retroactively to 7 January 1909. The first certificates were to established pioneers, among them Frenchman Louis Bleriot, Henry and Maurice Farman (UK) and the Wright Brothers (US).

The Royal Aero Club in the UK also began the issue of its first certificates in 1910. Among the earliest recipients of the first aviation certificates were: J. T. C. Moore-Brabazon, who conducted the first flight by a British pilot in Britain; Charles Stewart Rolls, co-founder of Rolls-Royce; Claude Grahame-White, who flew the first night flight; and Samuel Cody, pioneer of large kite flying.

British and French certificates were recognized internationally by the FAI.

The Aero Club of America began issuing licenses in 1911, although these were not mandatory, and were more for prestige and show. The first recipients were Glenn Curtiss, Frank Purdy Lahm, Louis Paulhan and the Wright brothers. The requirement for an Aero Club ticket was to ascend in the machine and fly a course of a figure-eight at a given height. Individual states sometimes posed a mandate for a license but it wasn't a Federal cause until 1917.

General structure of certification
Pilots are certified to fly aircraft at one or more named privilege levels and, at each privilege level, are rated to fly aircraft of specific categories. In the US, privilege levels of pilot certificates are (in order of increasing privilege):

 Student: Cannot fly solo without proper endorsement from a certificated flight instructor (CFI). Passenger carrying is prohibited.
 Sport: Cannot carry more than one passenger, authorized to fly only light-sport aircraft and are limited to daytime flying only. If an individual elects to receive additional instruction, some of the limitations may be removed.
 Recreational: May fly aircraft of up to 180 horsepower (130 kW) and 4 seats in the daytime for pleasure only.
 Private: May fly for pleasure or personal business. Private pilots cannot be paid, compensated to fly, or hired by any operator.
 Commercial: Can be paid, compensated to fly, or hired by operators and are required to have higher training standards than private or sport pilots.
 Flight instructor: Flight instructors are commercial pilots who have been trained and can demonstrate various teaching techniques, skills and knowledge related to safely teaching people to fly.
 Airline transport pilot: ATPs, as they are called, typically qualify to fly the major airliners of the US transit system. ATPs must qualify with a range of experience and training to be considered for this certificate.
 Remote Pilot Certificate (Drone): Remote piloting of aircraft that are unmanned and minimal in size.
 
Pilot privileges are further broken down into category, class, and type ratings.

A aircraft category is defined as "a broad classification of aircraft," which a pilot may be licensed for:
 Airplane
 Rotorcraft
 Glider
 Lighter-than-air
 Powered-lift
 Powered parachute
 Weight-shift-control
 Unmanned Aircraft Systems (UAS)
A pilot licensed to fly airplanes may not fly helicopters without an additional licence, for example.

A class is defined as "a classification of aircraft within a category having similar operating characteristics":
 Single-engine
 Multiengine (historically, a separate multi-engine rating was not required if not carrying passengers)
 Land
 Water
 Gyroplane
 Helicopter
 Airship
 Free balloon

In addition, a type rating is required for particular aircraft over 12,500 pounds, or aircraft that are turbojet-powered. Further logbook endorsements are required for high-performance (more than 200 horsepower), complex (retractable landing gear, flaps, and a controllable-pitch propeller), or tailwheel-equipped aircraft, as well as for high-altitude operations.

Most private pilot certificates are issued as "private pilot: airplane single-engine land," which means the pilot may fly any single-engine, land-based airplane they are qualified in. A pilot is only qualified in the category and class of aircraft in which they successfully complete their checkride (for example, a pilot who takes a commercial pilot checkride in a multi-engine, land-based aircraft and passes, may only exercise the privileges of a commercial pilot in multi-engine, land-based aircraft; the pilot may not exercise the privileges of a commercial pilot in single-engine or sea-based aircraft without passing the appropriate parts of a checkride in those particular categories of aircraft).

Pilots of powered aircraft typically attain ratings in this order (with minimum time required in parentheses):
 Private pilot (35–45 hours of flight time, 40 in the U.S.)
 Instrument rating (40–50 hours of instrument time, 40 in the U.S.)
 Commercial pilot (200–250 hours of flight time, 250 in the U.S.)
 Commercial pilot who is a co-pilot in an airliner (250 hours of flight time + multicrew rating, not allowed in the U.S.)
 Airline transport pilot (ATP) (1200–1500 hours of flight time, 1500 in the U.S.)

Note: Hours can often be earned concurrently and are cumulative. For example, after acquiring a private certificate, a pilot can get an instrument rating with an additional 30–40 hours of training (if, e.g., 10 hours of instrument time was logged during private training, which would count towards total aeronautical experience gained). In the course of the commercial pilot training, most pilots also receive their high-performance and complex logbook endorsements, as well as get a multiengine rating before applying for the airline transport pilot licence.

Private pilot licence

The majority of pilots hold a private pilot license. To obtain a private pilot license, one must be at least 17 years old and have a minimum of 35–45 hours of flight time, including at least 20 hours of dual instruction and 10 hours of solo flight. (Age requirements for gliders and balloons are slightly lower.) Pilots trained according to accelerated curricula outlined in Part 141 of the Federal Aviation Regulations may be certified with a minimum of 35 hours of flight time.

In EASA states and the United Kingdom, a private pilot licence requires at least 45 hours of flight instruction. This must include at least 25 hours of dual flight instruction, at least 10 hours of supervised solo flight time, and at least 5 hours of solo cross-country flight time. Up to 5 hours of instruction may be undertaken in a simulator. Pilots must also undergo a solo flight of at least 150 nautical miles, including full stop landings at two aerodromes different from the departure aerodrome.

Private pilots may not fly for compensation or hire. However, they may carry passengers as long as the pilot has the appropriate training, ratings, and endorsements. Private pilots must have a current Class III medical certificate, which must be renewed every 24 or 60 months (depending on age). In addition, like all licensed pilots they must re-validate their single-engine piston class rating with a logbook endorsement every 24 months by successfully completing a flight review with a flight instructor (CFI).

Instrument rating

An instrument rating is technically not a pilot certificate, but an add-on rating that allows an airplane or helicopter pilot to fly in weather with reduced visibility such as rain, low clouds, or heavy haze. When flying in these conditions, pilots follow instrument flight rules (IFR). The training provides the skills needed to complete flights with less than the required VFR minimums. In the US, all pilots who fly above 18,000 feet above mean sea level (MSL) (a lower limit of Class A airspace) must have an instrument rating, and must be on an IFR flight plan.

This rating requires highly specialized training by a certificated flight instructor (CFI) with a special instrument instruction rating (CFII), and completion of an additional written exam, oral exam, and flight test. Pilots applying for an instrument rating must hold a current private pilot certificate and medical, have logged at least 50 hours of cross-country flight time as pilot-in-command, and have at least 40 hours of actual or simulated instrument time including at least 15 hours of instrument flight training and instrument training on cross-country flight procedures.

Commercial pilot licence
Commercial pilots can be paid to fly an aircraft. To obtain a commercial pilot license in the United States, one must be at least 16 years old With Parent Permission And 18 Years Old Without Parent Consent and have a minimum of 250 hours of total flight time (190 hours under the accelerated curriculum defined in Part 141 of the Federal Aviation Regulations). (Age requirements for gliders and balloons are slightly lower.) This includes 100 hours in powered aircraft, 50 hours in airplanes, and 100 hours as pilot in command (of which 50 hours must be cross-country flight time). In addition, commercial pilots must hold an instrument rating, or otherwise they would be restricted to flying for hire only in daylight, under visual flight rules (VFR), and within 50 miles of the originating airport.

In EASA states and the United Kingdom, a pilot undergoing modular training must have 200 hours total of which 100 must be pilot in command. Pilots undergoing an integrated course must have a minimum of 150 hours. Pilots must fly a qualifying cross country flight of at least 300 nautical miles.

Airline transport pilot licence

Airline transport pilots (ATP) must be at least 18 years old and have a minimum of 1,500 hours of flight time, including 500 hours of cross-country flight time, 100 hours of night flying, and 75 hours in actual or simulated instrument flight conditions. ATPs must also have a commercial certificate and an instrument rating. ATPs may instruct other pilots in air transportation service in aircraft in which they are rated. ATPs must have a current Class I medical exam (which is more stringent than Class II or Class III), which must be renewed every six months or one year (depending on age). Like all pilots, they must re-validate their certificates every 24 months with a flight review but U.S. airlines require training at least once every 12 months, at which time a test is conducted that satisfies this bi-annual flight review.  After the 2009 crash of Colgan Air Flight 3407, Congress passed legislation, subsequently signed into law, requiring any pilot flying for a Federal Aviation Regulations (FAR) Part 121 airline (all United States major airlines and their regional affiliates), that requires three or more pilots to include new-hire first officers, must have had at least an "ATP certificate with restricted privileges" license except if you were licensed after July 31, 2013, then you must have an ATP certificate.

Multi-pilot licence

The Multi-pilot Licence (MPL) is a licence which allows a person to act as co-pilot in a Commercial Air Transport operation. It is available in the United Kingdom and EASA states. It does not exist in the United States or Canada.

MPL pilots must be at least 18 years old. They must have a minimum of 240 hours of flying training, the majority of which may be in a full-motion flight simulator with 40 hours and 12 takeoffs and landings total required in an actual airplane before flying passengers (per JAR-FCL 1.120 and 1.125(b)), and 750 hours of classroom theoretical knowledge instruction. The licence is typically achieved in approximately 16–18 months total time from no flight experience to flying for an airline. It was developed by the International Civil Aviation Organization (ICAO), and the requirements were included in the 10th edition of Annex 1 to the Convention on International Civil Aviation (Personnel Licensing), which superseded all previous editions of the Annex on 23 November 2006. The MPL is a significant development as it is based on competency-based approach to training professional pilots. It represents the first time in 30 years that ICAO had significantly reviewed the standards for the training of flight crew.

The MPL licence is restricted to the specific airline that the training was completed with, until a conversion course is completed. The course is completed in one continuous course with an Approved Training Organisations (ATO) that has an agreement with the airline. A risk of this is that if the airline goes bankrupt or withdraws its job offer, the licence cannot be used and further training must be undertaken.

Other licenses, ratings, and endorsements

Other licenses include:

 Sport pilot certificate (United States only), used for light-sport aircraft, a category that was designated in 2004. These aircraft are larger and faster than US ultralights, and carry more fuel and often one passenger in addition to the pilot. The ultralight category of aircraft in the US requires no specific training and no certification. Unlike all other pilot categories, special medical certification is not required for a sport pilot.
 Night rating, enables the private pilot to fly at night. A total of 5 hours' night flying (including at least 3 hours of dual instruction), 1 hour cross-country navigation, 5 solo flights and 5 full-stop landings are required to gain this rating in some countries. In the US, there is no night rating; pilots must have received instruction in night flying before they can take the practical test for the private rating.
 The pilots can add other various ratings when they qualify for them, i.e. either satisfy training requirements or pass appropriate tests.
 Unmanned Aircraft System (Drone) pilots are required to obtain a remote pilot airman certificate with a small UAS rating when operating commercially (US).

Licence specifications
A pilot's licence contains certain details to make sure the type of the licence, privileges and validity of the ratings are clear for every state. Here are some of the details found on a pilot's licence: 
 Issuing state
 Type of licence (ATPL/CPL/PPL/...)
 Details of the holder (name, nationality, date of birth, signature,...)
 Class/Type ratings (SEP/MEP/B737/A32F/...)
 Remarks: (Language proficiency level, endorsements, privileges, limitations,...)

See also
 Cross-country flying
 Joint Aviation Authorities
 Pilot certification in the United States
 Pilot licensing in Canada
 Pilot licensing in the United Kingdom
 EASA pilot licensing

References

External links

Flight Training Programs
How to Obtain your Private Pilot Certificate

Aviation licenses and certifications

de:Pilot#Fluglizenz